Timothy Bernard Washington (July 11, 1959 – January 4, 1992) was a defensive back in the National Football League. Washington was the final selection of the 1982 NFL Draft, selected by the San Francisco 49ers. He would split that season between the 49ers and the Kansas City Chiefs.

Washington's brother Anthony Washington also played in the NFL.

Professional career

San Francisco 49ers
The San Francisco 49ers waived him on September 6, 1982.

Kansas City Chiefs
Washington was waived by the Kansas City Chiefs on August 1, 1983.

Saskatchewan Roughriders
In May 1984, Washington signed a contract with the Saskatchewan Roughriders of the Canadian Football League.

References

Sportspeople from Fresno, California
San Francisco 49ers players
Kansas City Chiefs players
American football defensive backs
California Golden Bears football players
Fresno State Bulldogs football players
1959 births
Players of American football from California
1992 deaths